Blunsdon is a civil parish in the Borough of Swindon, in Wiltshire, England, about  north of the centre of Swindon, with the A419 forming its southern boundary. Its main settlement is the village of Broad Blunsdon, with Lower Blunsdon nearby; the hamlet of Broadbush is now contiguous with Broad Blunsdon.

Blunsdon is the eastern half of the former Blunsdon St Andrew civil parish. In April 2017, that parish was divided and the western half became a new St Andrews parish.

History
Blunsdon dates from Roman times: it was discovered that a Roman travellers’ resting place existed on the site of the present-day Cold Harbour public house. The main A419 road follow the course of a Roman road known as Ermin Street that linked the historic Roman towns of Gloucester (Glevum) and Silchester (Calleva Atrebatum), via Cirencester (Corinium).

The Domesday Book of 1086 recorded three estates at Bluntesdone, with altogether ten households.

Widhill 
Widhill, land lying north of Blunsdon St Andrew as far as the Roman road and bounded to the west by the River Ray, appears in Domesday Book as two estates at Wildehill with altogether 14 households. The area became a tithing of the parish of St Sampson, Cricklade, and for a time a small chapel served the two small settlements at Lower Widhill and Upper Widhill (sometimes North Widhill and West Widhill respectively). Robert Jenner, who prospered as a silver merchant in London, bought Widhill manor in 1624; the Jenner family remained at Widhill until the manor was sold in 1826.

In the late 19th century Widhill became part of Cricklade civil parish, then was transferred to Blunsdon in 1934; its population at the 1931 census had been 21.

Today, Lower Widhill Farm, Chapel Farm and Upper Widhill Farm survive in the strip of farmland between the north edge of Blunsdon St Andrew and the A419.

Sport
Blunsdon's Abbey Stadium (also known as Swindon Stadium) is the home of Swindon Greyhounds, broadcast world-wide three times per week and a stalwart of off course betting shops in the UK all the year round. The stadium has also been the home of a speedway team, the Swindon Robins, since it opened in 1949. The Robins competed in national leagues, including the Elite League in the 21st century, but did not race in 2021 or 2022 due to long-running uncertainty over redevelopment of the site.

The village has a football team, Blunsdon FC, which has youth development squads as well as a senior men's side playing in the Wiltshire League.

Government 
Blunsdon parish covers Broad Blunsdon and the area west of the A419. In the southeast, the boundary with St Andrews leaves the A419 and follows the A4311 Cricklade Road, so that the Groundwell industrial estate is in Blunsdon parish.

Until April 2017, the whole area was the civil parish of Blunsdon St Andrew. The parish lies within the Borough of Swindon.

Shop
After the last privately owned shop in the village closed in 2002, a village public meeting convened and agreed to open a new community shop, which was opened in 2003. Located in the car park of the village hall, the shop was originally based inside a secondhand site office cabin, but in 2009 this was replaced by a brand new structure. Run mainly by volunteers, in 2010 the shop won third place for 'Best Village Shop' at the Wiltshire Life Magazine Awards.

Transport

The Swindon and Cricklade Railway has rebuilt Blunsdon railway station, just outside the parish boundary.

A bypass was built between the autumn of 2006 and spring 2009. This reunited Broad Blunsdon village with the portion that was southwest of the former A419.

References

Civil parishes in Wiltshire
Borough of Swindon